Michael P. Ross is an American lawyer and former politician from Boston, Massachusetts, who represented District 8 (which includes Beacon Hill, Back Bay, and the Fenway) on the Boston City Council from 2000 through 2013. He was an unsuccessful candidate for mayor of Boston in 2013. Ross is now a real estate lawyer at Prince Lobel Tye LLP, and is a regular contributor to The Boston Globe.

Family
Ross is a first-generation American. He was born in 1972 to Stephan Ross, a survivor of The Holocaust, and the founder of the New England Holocaust Memorial.  Stephan Ross survived ten concentration camps during The Holocaust, and was rescued by American soldiers at Dachau. Ross's mother is openly gay. Ross's sister Julie works as a corporate attorney in Boston.

Career

Ross was first elected to the Boston City Council in November 1999, then re-elected to six two-year terms, serving a total of 14 years (2000–2013). He was president of the council for two one-year terms, 2009 and 2010.

Personal life
Ross lives in the East Boston neighborhood of Boston. He holds a bachelor's degree from Clark University in Worcester, an MBA from Boston University, and a J.D. degree from Suffolk University Law School. He is married to Karolina Chorvath, a Czechoslovakian-American journalist and chronic illness advocate.

References

External links
 

Boston City Council members
People from Beacon Hill, Boston
People from Back Bay, Boston
Fenway–Kenmore
Clark University alumni
American people of Polish-Jewish descent
Jewish American people in Massachusetts politics
1972 births
Living people
People from East Boston, Boston
Lawyers from Boston
Boston University School of Management alumni
Suffolk University Law School alumni
21st-century American Jews